Tonight a City Will Die is a 1961 Polish drama film directed by Jan Rybkowski. It was entered into the 2nd Moscow International Film Festival where Boguslaw Lambach won the Silver Prize for Director of Photography.

Cast
 Andrzej Łapicki as Piotr
 Beata Tyszkiewicz as Magda
 Jadwiga Chojnacka as Aunt Poldi
 Ignacy Gogolewski as SS Lt. Eryk
 Bernard Hecht as French Man
 Barbara Horawianka as Blonde Girl
 Kalina Jędrusik as Prostitute
 Emil Karewicz as Kurt Zumpe
 Elżbieta Kępińska as Worker
 Barbara Krafftówna as Iza
 Jadwiga Kuryluk as Weronika Zumpe
 Stanisław Łapiński as German in Shelter

References

External links
 

1961 films
1961 drama films
1960s Polish-language films
Polish black-and-white films
Films directed by Jan Rybkowski
Polish drama films